Megan Crewe is a Canadian young adult writer, born in 1980 in Toronto, Ontario, Canada. She attended high school at Riverdale Collegiate Institute in Toronto before going on to complete a degree in psychology from York University and working as a behavioral therapist for teens in Toronto. She was published by New Canadian Voices, In2Print and the Toronto School Boards poetry and prose periodicals before becoming a young adult writer with a number of books and book series to her name. In 2019 Crewe was on the Sunburst Award Longlist.

Bibliography
Give Up the Ghost (2009)
A Mortal Song (2016)
Beast (2017)
Series
Conspiracy of Magic
Magic Unmasked (2018)
 Ruthless Magic (2018)
 Wounded Magic (2018)
 Fearless Magic (2019)
Earth & Sky
 Earth & Sky (2014)
 The Clouded Sky (2015)
 A Sky Unbroken (2015)
Fallen World
 The Way We Fall (2012)
 The Lives We Lost (2013)
 The Worlds We Make (2014)
Carry the Earth (2014)
Those Who Lived (2014)
Trial by Fire (2014)
Water Song (2014)
The Fallen World: Complete Series (2018)
Short Fiction
Seven Years (2004)
The Alien and the Tree (2006)
Frozen (2006)
The Great Thrakkian Rebellion (2007)

References

1980 births
21st-century Canadian women writers
Writers from Toronto
York University alumni
Living people
Canadian writers of young adult literature
Canadian women children's writers